Ramkishun (born 3 August 1956) is a member of the 15th Lok Sabha of India. He represented the Chandauli constituency of Uttar Pradesh and is a member of the Samajwadi Party (SP) political party.

Education and background
Ramkishun has Bachelor of Arts

Posts held

See also
List of members of the 15th Lok Sabha of India

References

India MPs 2009–2014
1956 births
Living people
People from Chandauli district
Uttar Pradesh MLAs 2002–2007
Uttar Pradesh MLAs 2007–2012
Lok Sabha members from Uttar Pradesh
Samajwadi Party politicians
Samajwadi Party politicians from Uttar Pradesh